Pseudosturmia is a genus of parasitic flies in the family Tachinidae.

Species
Pseudosturmia clavipalpis Thompson, 1966

References

Endemic fauna of Trinidad and Tobago
Monotypic Brachycera genera
Diptera of North America
Exoristinae
Tachinidae genera